Montefiore Mount Vernon Hospital is an 1890s-founded hospital that had been "designated a total-care trauma facility since 1984." In 1986 they expanded and added "a new 20-bed psychiatric unit and a rehabilitation unit." The hospital also formed an AIDS program.

The Mount Vernon hospital changed its name to Montefiore Mount Vernon Hospital when it was taken over by Montefiore Health Systems.

History
The cornerstone for Mount Vernon Hospital was laid in 1893.

The hospital was located in Mount Vernon's downtown area, which is "only about a mile square and densely built." It was described in 1986
as "a major institution;" in 1996 it was described as "a financially distressed institution."

They had already begun to specialize in healing chronic wound cases in 1989. In 1996 they affiliated with another hospital and specialized more, including focused services for mental-health patients. They already had experience at working with other hospitals, such as offering a program for local diabetics, aided by a larger Bronx-based teaching hospital. In 1999 they closed their maternity unit, and redirected expecting mothers to an affiliated hospital that tripled the capacity of "its neonatal and maternity wing."

They were a flagship "to prevent the spread of infectious diseases within hospitals and within the community." Part of this included reaching out to young children with a 'pledge' to wash their hands.

References

  

Hospitals in New York (state)